The 5th constituency of the Loiret (French: Cinquième circonscription du Loiret) is a French legislative constituency in the Loiret département. Like the other 576 French constituencies, it elects one MP using a two round electoral system.

Description

The 5th Constituency of the Loiret lies in the north of the department covering a largely rural area on the border with Île-de-France making it within easy reach of Paris.

This seat traditionally supported candidates from the conservative centre right parties. In 2017 the seat was held by The Republicans by the slender margin of 88 votes in the second round against En Marche!. However, LR did subsequently lose the seat to LREM in 2022, who narrowly defeated the far-right RN candidate by just 11 votes in the second roung.

Assembly Members

Election results

2022

 
 
|-
| colspan="8" bgcolor="#E9E9E9"|
|-

2017

 
 
 
 
 
 
 
 
|-
| colspan="8" bgcolor="#E9E9E9"|
|-

2012

 
 
 
 
|-
| colspan="8" bgcolor="#E9E9E9"|
|-

References

5